Agaraea minuta is a moth of the family Erebidae. It was described by William Schaus in 1892. It is found from Mexico to Guatemala and Brazil.

References

Moths described in 1892
Phaegopterina
Moths of North America
Moths of South America